Lisboa Island is an island in Guinea-Bissau. It is located in the Mansoa River, just east of the confluence with the Baboque River. Its maximum elevation is 9 m.

See also
List of islands of Guinea-Bissau

References

External links
Airplane crash near the island
Islands of Guinea-Bissau